= RealMassive =

- Type: Privately held company
- Industry: Commercial Real Estate technology
- Founded: May 23, 2013
- Defunct: 2020
- Fate: Unknown
- Headquarters: Austin, TX, United States
- Area served: United States
- Key people: Michael Clark (CEO)
- Products: Commercial Real Estate Marketplace and Data Provider
- Number of employees: 27
- Website: www.realmassive.com

RealMassive was an American commercial real estate marketplace and data provider that operated between 2013 and 2020. The company's technology platform and software enabled people to discover commercial real estate and access a standardized, up-to-date data set of available listings to analyze and evaluate commercial real estate market performance.

RealMassive's data collection process enabled the company to develop a database of local listings that tracked activity in markets across the United States to monitor and analyze performance using up to date information. The technology provided the commercial real estate industry with frequent updates and information on listing activity, allowing the community to adapt to market conditions in real-time.

== History ==
RealMassive was a privately held company headquartered in Austin, Texas. It was founded in May 2013 and received funding from local investors. Investments totaled $4.6 million in October 2014.

As of January 1, 2019, the platform included data for over 6.1 billion square feet of space in 34 markets.

== Services ==
The company allowed the commercial real estate industry to add and search commercial real estate listings via an online marketplace. The company then provides access to this real-time data to brokerages, developers, government entities, financial institutions, and others.
